Dr. Frost is a South Korean manhwa series written and illustrated by Lee Jong-beom. This webtoon was released on internet portal Naver WEBTOON from February 2, 2011 to October 1, 2021, then the first volume in print was published on May 18, 2012. It was adapted into a TV series of the same name in 2014.

References

External links
 Dr. Frost official website on Naver 
 Dr. Frost official website on WEBTOON 

Manhwa titles
Naver Comics titles
2011 webtoon debuts
South Korean webtoons
Comics adapted into television series
Police procedurals
Thriller comics
2010s webtoons
Webtoons in print